Light barrier may refer to:
The theoretical maximum speed that any physical object or information can travel at – the speed of light
An opto-electronic device used in security applications, also known as a light curtain